Pseudatemelia josephinae is a moth of the family Oecophoridae. It is found in Europe.

The wingspan is about 20 mm. The moth flies from June to August depending on the location.

The larvae feed on dead and decaying leaves.

References

External links
 Pseudatemelia josephinae at UKmoths

Amphisbatinae
Moths of Japan
Moths of Europe
Moths described in 1956